Anvis (Antivibrationssystems) is a global business group that specialises in antivibration systems to decouple vibrating parts in motor vehicles. The company's head office is located in Steinau an der Straße, Germany.

Company 
Anvis Group GmbH operates 13 business sites around the world. Its 2,500 employees generate annual turnover of more than €300 million. In 2013, the company was acquired by the Japanese Sumitomo Riko group from the Sumitomo Group. The product range of the Anvis Group was significantly expanded as a result of the simultaneous acquisition of Dytech, an Italian company that makes special fluid-handling products. Together, the business group generates turnover of nearly €3 billion. The customer structure comprises Original Equipment Manufacturer (OEM) like the Volkswagen AG, BMW, Daimler AG, Audi, Renault-Nissan, Mazda, Toyota and General Motors and first-tier companies (the direct suppliers to OEMs) like Continental AG. Anvis Industry SAS, a subsidiary of the Anvis Group, also supplies solutions and products to the railroad industry, among others.

The AVS Holding 2 GmbH owns 100 percent of shares in Anvis Netherlands B.V., which holds all foreign subsidiaries.

Products 
The Anvis Group's products include vibration control solutions for automotive and industrial applications. The foundation of the products is its processing of natural rubber, synthetic elastomers and plastics. The Anvis Group holds more than 160 patents in this area.

History 
Kléber-Colombes, a company specialising in elastomers and expansion joints, was established in 1910. Nearly 50 years later, in 1956, the automotive supplier Woco Industrietechnik GmbH went into operation. In 1980, Woco entered the antivibration sector. Its work soon resulted in the first automotive parts that used a rubber-metal combination that could reduce vibration and driving noise in cars. The basis of these parts was innovations in the area of natural-rubber, plastic and metal adhesion technology. Michelin acquired the Kléber Group in 1982, established CMP Kléber Industry and also worked in the area of rubber processing for vehicles. At the turn of the millennium, the knowledge acquired in this work flowed into a Joint Venture set up by Woco and Michelin. Under the name Woco Michelin AVS, the company made its products at its base in Bad Soden-Salmünster and locations around the world. 
In 2007, Olaf Hahn joined with the financial investor Arques Industries AG to acquire the joint venture and gave the company the name that it uses today, Anvis Group GmbH. Olaf Hahn became managing director, a position that he still holds today. With the complete takeover by the Japanese Sumitomo Riko Company Limited, a strategic investor from the relevant industry acquired the company in 2013.

References 

Companies based in Hesse
Automotive companies of Germany
Mechanical vibrations